was a Japanese mathematician who worked mainly in mathematical analysis and who posed the Kakeya problem and solved a version of the transportation problem. He received the Imperial Prize of the Japan Academy in 1928, and was elected to  the Japan Academy in 1934.

References

 Kakeya, S. (1912-13) "On the Limits of the Roots of an Algebraic Equation with Positive Coefficients," Tohoku Mathematical Journal (First Series),2:140–142.

1886 births
1947 deaths
20th-century Japanese mathematicians
University of Tokyo alumni
Academic staff of the University of Tokyo
Academic staff of the University of Tsukuba
Laureates of the Imperial Prize